Joanthan Run is a  long 2nd order tributary to the Youghiogheny River in Fayette County, Pennsylvania.

Variant names
According to the Geographic Names Information System, it has also been known historically as:
Jonathans Run

Course
Jonathan Run rises about 2 miles west of Kaufmann, Pennsylvania, and then flows northeast to join the Youghiogheny River about 1 mile north of Deer Lake.

Watershed
Jonathan Run drains  of area, receives about 50.0 in/year of precipitation, has a wetness index of 343.71, and is about 94% forested.

See also
List of rivers of Pennsylvania

References

Tributaries of the Youghiogheny River
Rivers of Pennsylvania
Rivers of Fayette County, Pennsylvania